"Can You Find It in Your Heart?" is a pop song with music by Robert Allen and lyrics by Al Stillman, published in 1956.

The recording by Tony Bennett was released by Columbia Records as catalog number 40667. It first reached the Billboard magazine charts on May 5, 1956 and lasted 11 weeks on the chart. On the Disk Jockey chart, it peaked at #20; on the Best Seller chart, at #16; on the Juke Box chart, at #18; on the composite chart of the top 100 songs, it reached #19.

References

Songs with music by Robert Allen (composer)
Songs with lyrics by Al Stillman
1956 songs
Tony Bennett songs
1956 singles
Columbia Records singles